Choozhattukotta is a village situated on the perimeter of Thiruvananthapuram, Kerala, India. It is located 9 km from Trivandrum Central.

Pincode of Choozhattukotta, Malayam P O Thiruvananthapuram, Kerala is 695571
Choozhattukotta is situated in a beautiful agricultural village Vilavoorkkal

References

Villages in Thiruvananthapuram district